Mariusz Kujawski (born November 17, 1986) is a Polish sprint canoer who has competed since the late 2000s. He won a silver medal in the K-2 1000 m event at the 2007 ICF Canoe Sprint World Championships in Duisburg.

Kujawski finished fourth in the K-2 1000 m event at the 2008 Summer Olympics in Beijing, but was changed to disqualified upon Adam Seroczyński's testing for positive for clenbuterol in a doping test.

References

Sports-reference.com profile

1986 births
Canoeists at the 2008 Summer Olympics
Living people
Olympic canoeists of Poland
Polish male canoeists
People from Chełmża
ICF Canoe Sprint World Championships medalists in kayak
Sportspeople from Kuyavian-Pomeranian Voivodeship
European Games competitors for Poland
Canoeists at the 2015 European Games
Universiade medalists in canoeing
Universiade gold medalists for Poland
Universiade silver medalists for Poland
Universiade bronze medalists for Poland
Medalists at the 2013 Summer Universiade